Bhander Assembly constituency is one of the 230 Vidhan Sabha (Legislative Assembly) constituencies of Madhya Pradesh state in central India. This constituency is reserved for the candidates belonging to the Scheduled castes from its inception.

Overview
Bhander is one of the 3 Vidhan Sabha constituencies located in Datia district. This constituency covers the entire Bhander tehsil and part of Datia tehsil of the district.

Bhander is part of Bhind Lok Sabha constituency along with seven other Vidhan Sabha segments, namely, Sewda and Datia in this district and Bhind, Ater, Lahar, Mehgaon and Gohad in Bhind district.

Members of Legislative Assembly
As a part of Pichhore Gird constituency: 
 1957: Brinda Sahai, Indian National Congress / Raja Ram Singh, Indian National Congress
As Bhander constituency: 
 1962: Raja Ram Singh, Indian National Congress
 1967: Kishorilal Hans, Bharatiya Jana Sangh
 1972: Chaturbhuj Morya, Bharatiya Jana Sangh
 1977: Nand Lal Saroniya, Janata Party
 1980: Kamlapat Arya, Indian National Congress (I)
 1985: Radhesham Chandoriya, Indian National Congress
 1990: Pooram Singh Palaiya, Bharatiya Janata Party
 1993: Keshri Choudhary, Indian National Congress
 1998: Phool Singh Baraiya, Bahujan Samaj Party
 2003: Kamlapat Arya, Bharatiya Janata Party
 2008: Asha Ram Ahirwar, Bharatiya Janata Party
 2013: Ghanshyam Pironiya, Bharatiya Janata Party
 2018: Raksha Santram Saroniya, Indian National Congress

See also
 Bhander

References

Datia district
Assembly constituencies of Madhya Pradesh